Nicole Bouma (born April 24, 1981) is a Canadian voice actress who works for Ocean Studios in Vancouver, British Columbia, Canada. She is best known as the voice of Mint Blancmanche from the Galaxy Angel series, Blossom from Powerpuff Girls Z, and Mai from Popotan.

Personal life
Bouna is married to voice actor Brent Miller and together they have two daughters named Chelsea Miller and Jaeda Lily Miller.

Filmography
 Being Ian (TV) as Leni
 Boys Over Flowers (TV) as Makiko Endo
 Coconut Fred's Fruit Salad Island as Mrs. Eyeball
 Dinosaur Train (TV) as Soren Saurornitholestes
 Dokkoida?! (TV) as Kosuzu Sakurazaki/Tanpopo
 Galaxy Angel (TV) as Mint Blancmanche
 Galaxy Angel A (TV) as Mint Blancmanche
 Galaxy Angel S (TV) as Mint Blancmanche
 Galaxy Angel X (TV) as Mint Blancmanche
 Galaxy Angel Z (TV) as Mint Blancmanche
 Gin Tama (TV) as Ayame Sarutobi
 Holly Hobbie & Friends as Holly Hobbie (Episode 5 & 6)
 Human Crossing (TV) as Office Girl; Woman at Party 2; Young Ryoko
 Inuyasha (TV) as Botan, Hitomi, Shiori
 Inuyasha the Movie: Fire on the Mystic Island as Ai
 Krypto the Superdog (TV) as Snooky Wookums
 Mobile Suit Gundam SEED Destiny (TV) as Meyrin Hawke
 Mobile Suit Gundam 00 (TV) as Nena Trinity
 My Little Pony: Friendship Is Magic (TV) as Rain Shine
My Scene Jammin' in Jamaica as Chelsea
My Scene Masquerade Madness as Chelsea
 My Scene Goes Hollywood: The Movie as Chelsea
 Nana as Mai Tsuzuki (Misato Uehara)
 Polly Pocket: Lunar Eclipse as Ana
 Polly Pocket: 2 Cool at the Pocket Plaza as Ana
 PollyWorld as Crissy
 Popotan (TV) as Mai 
 Powerpuff Girls Z (TV) as Blossom
 Shakugan no Shana (TV) as Marianne, Matake Ogata (Season 1)
 Star Ocean EX (TV) as Rena Lanford; [+ unlisted credits]
 Starship Operators (TV) as Miyuri Akisato
 The Daichis - Earth Defence Family (TV) as Ellen Shiratori
 Zoids: Fuzors (TV) as Sweet Exter

References

External links
 
 
 Nicole Bouma at Crystal Acids Database

1981 births
Living people
Actresses from Vancouver
Canadian voice actresses
20th-century Canadian actresses
21st-century Canadian actresses
Place of birth missing (living people)